Abdulkadir Mohamed Nur aka 'Jama' is the current Minister of Justice for Federal Government of Somalia.

Life 
Previously, Nur served as the Acting and the Deputy Director of the National Intelligence and Security Agency. Prior to this, Nur has served as both the First Counsellor and Chargé d’Affaires, in the Embassy of the Federal Republic of Somalia in Turkey and the Senior Advisor to the Speaker of the House of the People. His main role was to provide expert advice to the Speaker of the House of the People and also identify and analyze technical issues or challenges that may face the speaker of the House and provide recommendations accordingly.

During his tenure in Ankara, he served as the First Secretary  at Somali Embassy in Ankara, Turkey (2012-2016) and Second Secretary at Somali Embassy in Ankara, Turkey (2009-2012). Prior to joining the Ministry of Foreign Affairs, Nur worked as the Head of Security in Villa Somalia (the Presidential Palace).

Nur holds his Bachelor's Degree in International Relations at Political Science Department from Ankara University which is known as, Mekteb-i Mülkiye, the most reputed political science university in Turkey. He is fluent in Somali, English, and Turkish. Nur is married and has 2 children.

References 

Year of birth missing (living people)
Living people